The Journal of Eurasian Studies is a biannual peer-reviewed academic journal covering research on the Eurasian region. It was established in 2010 by the Asia-Pacific Research Center of Hanyang University. From 2010 to 2018, the department published it in association with Elsevier; since 2019 it publishes it in association with SAGE Publishing.

Abstracting and indexing
The journal is abstracted and indexed in the Index Islamicus and Scopus.

Editors-in-chief
The following persons are or have been editor-in-chief:
Gu Ho Eom (Hanyang University) and Stephen White (Glasgow University; current)
Florian Farkas (former)

References

External links

Publications established in 2010
Area studies journals
Hanyang University
SAGE Publishing academic journals
Biannual journals
English-language journals
Creative Commons Attribution-licensed journals